"Sherry Fraser" is the name of the third single by alternative rock/post-grunge band Marcy Playground. Although nowhere near as successful as the band's earlier smash hit "Sex and Candy," nor the minor hit "St. Joe on the Schoolbus," the song did receive moderate radio and MTV2 airplay in 1998. The track is named for a friend of the band, who is credited on the band's eponymous debut album as S. Fraser, the co-writer of the track "Ancient Walls of Flowers".

Sherry Fraser, the namesake of the song, is the founder of the band Two Ton Boa.

Track listing
 "Sherry Fraser" - 2:50

References

1998 singles
1998 songs
Marcy Playground songs
Capitol Records singles
Songs about musicians
Cultural depictions of American women
Songs written by John Wozniak
Music videos directed by Kevin Kerslake